The Network of Concerned Anthropologists (NCA) is an independent ad hoc network of anthropologists seeking to promote an ethical anthropology.

The network is concerned that the "war on terror" threatens to militarize anthropology in a way that undermines the integrity of the discipline. Therefore, the network offers the possibility to sign a pledge where it is stated what kinds of work anthropologists should not engage in.

The founding members of the Network of Concerned Anthropologists include Catherine Besteman, Andrew Bickford, Greg Feldman, Gustaaf Houtman, Roberto Gonzalez, Hugh Gusterson, Jean Jackson, Kanhong Lin, Catherine Lutz, David Price, and David Vine.

External links
Website of the Network of Concerned Anthropologists

Anthropology-related professional associations